Tourism in Jepara is an important component of the economy of Jepara and a significant source of tax revenue. 8472 Tourism in Jepara attract foreign visitors in 2010. Jepara is a town which known for their culinary, education, tourism, and rich cultural heritage. There are many possibilities and opportunities lies for the city to prosper and benefits more, but yet until now the government has not yet fully utilized them. Jepara although only a small town but has many tourist attractions, the mountain tourism, beach tourism, underwater tours, tour the islands. Foreign tourists often visit Tirto Samodra Beach (Bandengan Beach), Karimunjava Island (Crimon Java), Kartini Beach, etc.

Branding 
In late September 2008 Jepara Regent Hendro Martojo announced that "Visit Jepara" brand used by cities and countries official tourism promotion campaign, Visit Jepara have themed logo Jepara wood carving. Visit Jepara reflect the brand invites people to enjoy the city's natural beauty, unique culture, varied food, friendly people and price competitiveness.

Major tourist destinations
Jepara with over 100 tourist attractions to explore, it is:

Karimunjava District
 Barakuda Beach
 Nirwana Beach
 Ujung Gelam Beach
 Batu Topeng Beach
 Yamin Beach
 Annora Beach
 Kemloko Beach
 Batu Karang Pengantin Beach
 Shark Conservation
 Turtle Conservation
 Tracking Mangrove Forest
 Legon Lele
 Mamaing Mount
 Gede Mount
 Hill Love 
 Hallway Love (Lorong Cinta)
 Jokotuo Hill
 Nyamplungan Hill
 Nyamplungan Waterfall
 Menyawakan Island

Donorojo District
 Sima Temple
 Blingoh Lake
 Undak Manuk Waterfall
 Grenjengan Waterfall
 Jurang Ngantin Waterfall (Jurang Manten Waterfall)
 Tratak Cave
 Tritip Cave
 Pecatu Gua Manik Beach 
 Mandalika Island
 Fort Portuguese

Keling District
 Angin Temple
 Bubrah Temple
 Beringin Beach
 Blorong Cave 
 Watu Ombo Stone
 Kedung Pancur Telu Waterfall 
 Curug Kemiri Waterfall
 Curug Kyai Buku Waterfall

Kembang District
 Bayuran Beach
 Suweru Beach
 Lemah Abang Beach
 Dudakawu Stone Town (Kota Watu)
 Sumanding Pinus Indah
 Songgo Langit Waterfall
 Jenggureng Waterfall
 Nglamer Waterfall
 Nglumprit Waterfall
 Grinjingan Dowo Waterfall
 Sendang Sinatah
 Manik Cave
 Sentral Park

Bangsri District
 Ombak Mati Beach
 Sejuta Akar Lake
 Nggembong Waterfall
 Kedung Ombo Waterfall
 Klebut Lake
 Watu Mbrayot

Mlonggo District
 Pailus Beach
 Blebak Beach
 Suweru Beach
 Ujung Piring Beach
 Empu Rancak Beach
 Jepara Ocean Park

Pakis Aji District
 Sakti Cave
 Akar Seribu
 Kedung Plumpang
 Jurang Nganten Waterfall
 Kalen Wates Waterfall
 Plajan Village Tour
 World Peace Gong Museum

Jepara District
 Kartini Museum
 Carving Museum
 Panjang Island
 Kartini Beach
 Tirto Samodra Beach (Bandengan Beach)
 Pendapa Jepara
 Fort VOC Jepara
 Baitul Makmur Great Mosque

Tahunan District
 Semat Beach
 Teluk Awur Beach
 Tegalsambi Beach
 Mloso Indah Waterfall 
 Ngipik Indah Waterfall 
 Mantingan Mosque

Batealit siggahan bringin  District
 Wono Pinus Setro
 Banyu Anjlok Waterfall
 Sumenep Waterfall
 Cabe Waterfall
 Statah Waterfall
 Pancuran Waterfall
 Seberuk Waterfall
 Nongko Pace Waterfall
 Grojokan Wergol Waterfall

Pecangaan District
 Punden Lake
 Bongpes
 Karangrandu Traditional Food Market

Kedung District
 Kedungmalang

Kalinyamatan District
 Batukali Village Tour
 Gate of Robayan Mosque
 Palace of Kalinyamat Kingdom (Siti Inggil Kriyan)
 Tiara Park

Mayong District
 Suroloyo Waterfall

Welahan District
 Karanganyar Traditional Toys Village
 Hian Thian Siang Tee Temple

Nalumsari District
 Sreni Indah
 Kemiren Waterfall
 Belik Bidadari and Jaka Tarub Lake

Event
Jepara held several events every year, it is:
 Festival Kartini
is event celebrate the Anniversary Jepara memorial and commemoration of Kartini Day . Festival Kartini is a tradition in the show on the month of April. If we want to go there, we can use private car. 
 Pesta Lomban
is sea alms ceremony in the form of offerings buffalo head that floated in the sea Jepara, So that swept away the buffalo head eaten by fish. Pesta Lomban is as an expression of gratitude to God. Therefore, with the Lomban giving alms or feed the fish, it can foster a sense of caring for the environment and that fishermen are not greedy with the dredge as much natural wealth, especially the sea. Pesta Lomban is a tradition in the show on the 7th month of Shawwal. If we want to go there, we can use private car.  
 Pesta Baratan
is carnival traditions Impes (traditional lanterns Kalinyamat) in the show on the 15th of Sha'ban. The word "baratan" comes from an Arabic word, which is "baraah" which means salvation or "barakah" meaning blessing. Tradition Pesta Baratan arranged by theme cavalcade Queen Kalinyamat and his troops holding Impes and Torch. If we want to go there, we can use private car.  
 Festival Oncor 
is a tradition convoy in the show on the evening of the 10th month of Dhu al-Hijjah. Festival brings Oncor Oncor participants with a variety of themes and designs, participants carried Oncor There also were carrying traditional Oncor unique design. If we want to go there, we can use private car.  
 Perang Obor
is a battle using coconut fronds that have been dried and the inside is filled with dried banana leaves. Torches are lit together have available to use as a tool to attack each other so that frequent collisions that could result in the glowing torch-flames were huge, which gave rise to the name of the torch War. If we want to go there, we can use private car. 
 Memeden Gadhu Festival
is a tradition convoy scarecrow. Memeden Gadhu Festival held in the Kepuk village. Participants wore peasant costumes and traditional Javanese clothes, bring tumpeng and scarecrows various forms. If we want to go there, we can use private car.   
 Festival Jondang
is the parade bring jondang containing food and agricultural products is a tradition bachelor application to a virgin girl to get to the wedding. Before the parade began, people first offered by traditional crafts. only then one by one the participants paraded the creations jondang to punden Mbah Kawak. If we want to go there, we can use private car.  
 Jembul Tulakan
is jembul parade in the village Tulakan. Jembul is in the form of parts of bamboo are parsed as thin as a hair. Parts of bamboo gathered with other grain as an offering. Jembul Tulakan ceremony is an expression of gratitude to God. If we want to go there, we can use private car.   
 Jembul Bedekah
is jembul parade in the village Banyumanis. Jembul is in the form of parts of bamboo are parsed as thin as a hair. Parts of bamboo gathered with other grain as an offering. Jembul Bedekah ceremony is an expression of gratitude to God. If we want to go there, we can use private car.  
 Barikan
is a form of expression of gratitude and sharing with fellow creatures of God's creation in the sea Karimunjava. To that end, the cone does not only produce, but also from the sea. If we want to go there, we can use private car.  < 
 Jepara Thongtek Carnival
is parade in which participants no use kentongan, gong, bedug, gendang, gamelan, angklung, trumpet. Parade participants shouting yells "sahur... sahur...," Parade participants also uses an interesting costume. Jepara Thongtek Carnival is a tradition convoy in the show on the evening of the month of Ramadhan. If we want to go there, we can use private car.   
 Jepara Bedug Festival is a parade in which participants use Bedug while Takbir peal. Jepara Bedug Festival  is a traditional convoy in the show on the evening of the 1st month of Shawwal. If we want to go there, we can use private car.

Art culture
Jepara have traditional cultural arts are very interesting, it is:
 Barongan Dencong
 Wayang Golek Langkung
 Kridhajati Dance
 Impes Dance
 Tenun Troso Dance
 Emprak Dance
 Tayub Dance
 Samroh
 Gambus
 Angguk
 Dagelan
 Kentrung
 Ludruk
 Ketropak
 Keroncong
 Prasah
Samroh, Gambus, and Angguk, types of traditional art all themed Islam. Other types of traditional arts is Dagelan, Emprak, Ketropak, Ludruk, Kentrung, Keroncong, dan Prasah. Through some of these traditional arts, the government used to convey messages to the public for instance on the development and healthy families.

References

External links
 

 
Tourism in Indonesia